Tricio is a village in the province and autonomous community of La Rioja, Spain.

Politics

Places of interest

 Basilica of Saint Mary of the Arches

Notable people
 Mariano de la Paz Graells y de la Agüera
 Celedón Pardo y Agüero

References

Populated places in La Rioja (Spain)